Oralabor is an unincorporated community in Polk County, in the U.S. state of Iowa.

History
Coal mining was the primary economic activity in Oralabor in the early 1900s. A depot on the Chicago & North Western Railway stood in Oralabor. The etymology of the name Oralabor is likely from the Latin phrase “Ora Et Labora” which means to pray and work.

Oralabor's population was 76 in 1925.

References

Unincorporated communities in Polk County, Iowa
Unincorporated communities in Iowa